Transracial may refer to:

 Transracial adoption, placing a child of one racial or ethnic group with adoptive parents of another racial or ethnic group
 Transracial (identity), having a racial identity or racial expression that differs from one's race of birth
 Racial transformation, the process by which a region changes in racial composition

See also
 Passing (racial identity), a person classified as a member of one racial group is also accepted as a member of a different racial group
Racial misrepresentation, when someone misrepresents their ethnic or racial background
 Minnesota Transracial Adoption Study, a study on whether non-white children adopted by white families gained an IQ advantage.
 Multiracial, people with an identifiable heritage from more than a single racial group
 Ethnic plastic surgery, changing an individual's appearance to look more or less like a particular race or ethnicity
 Hypatia transracialism controversy, an academic debate triggered by a comparison of Caitlyn Jenner to Rachel Dolezal which suggested a rejection of biology is akin to rejecting a socially constructed racial identity
 List of interracial topics